The Lansdowne Bridge (Sindhi لينسڊائون پل) over the Indus at Sukkur was one of the great engineering feats of the 19th century.  The longest cantilever bridge ever built, it had to support the load of heavy steam locomotives. The bridge was inaugurated on March 25, 1889. The Ayub Bridge was built immediately adjacent to the bridge in 1962, to separate the road and Railway traffic. Hence the photographs of the Landsdown Bridge usually also show the Ayub Bridge.

Design
It was designed by Sir Alexander Meadows Rendel; he designed the Lansdowne Bridge Rohri at Sukkur over the Indus River, which when it was completed in 1889 was the largest cantilever bridge in the world.  The girder work, weighing a massive 3,300 tons, was manufactured in London by the firm of Westwood, Baillie and erected by F.E. Robertson, and Hecquet. Upon completion, the bridge allowed for easier rail access between Sindh and Balochistan.

Background

The Indus was bridged at Attock in 1887 and that allowed railways in India to run from the westernmost post of Khyber Pass to the eastern city of Calcutta.

India's rail link to the port of Karachi was however, still broken at the Indus flowing between the towns of Rohri and Sukkur. The Indus was not bridged between Kotri and Hyderabad either, therefore, trains ran on the Karachi-Jamshoro-Larkana-Sukkur route as early as 1879 and then they were ferried across to Rohri and vice versa on a river ferry.

At Sukkur the river Indus flows through a gap in a range of low limestone hills and gets divided into two channels (Sukkur and Rohri channels) by an island called Bukkur. The Bukkur Island thus provides the best spot for a river crossing. 
Bridging the channel between Bukkur and Rohri was not so easy. The river bed here is not rocky but silty which made it difficult to build a bridge pier. Therefore, bridge designs were put forward to build a bridge without a pillar. One such design was for an arched bridge but it was not considered in the 1870s. Later on in 1962, the river was bridged using a very similar design that came to be known as the Ayub arch.

History
 
The Indus Valley State Railway had reached Sukkur in 1879 and the steam ferry that transported eight wagons at a time across the Indus between Rohri and Sukkur was found to be cumbersome and time-consuming.  The ferry link became redundant when Lord Reay, Governor of Bombay, deputising for Lord Lansdowne the viceroy, inaugurated the Bridge on March 25, 1889.
As summer comes early to Sukkur and the heavy European-style uniforms of the time would have been uncomfortable, the opening ceremony took place early in the morning. At the ceremony, Lord Reay unlocked a highly ornamental padlock (designed by J.L. Kipling, CIE, Principal of the Mayo School of Art in Lahore and father of Joseph Rudyard, the famous poet and author) which held shut the cumbersome iron gates guarding entry to the bridge.  The gathered dignitaries then walked across the bridge and adjourned to breakfast followed by toasts under a shamiana (Berridge 1967:128).  The bridge provided the railway link between Lahore, in the heart of the granary of British India, and the port of Karachi on the Arabian Sea.

When the great steel Ayub arch was constructed (1960–1962), railway traffic was shifted there. About a hundred feet apart, the two bridges seem like one from a distance. The Ayub arch became the world's third longest railway arch span and the first bridge in the world to have "the railway deck slung on coiled wire rope suspenders." The consulting engineer was David B. Steinman of New York, proponent of 'vocational aesthetics'. It cost about two crore rupees and the foundation stone was laid on December 9, 1960. It was opened by President Muhammad Ayub Khan on May 6, 1962.

Technical Briefs

Between 1872 and 1882 bridge survey was conducted and different people suggested 5 different bridge proposals. None of them were considered completely feasible at that time. An engineer by the name of Sir Alexander Rendel was then called in and he proposed a design consisting of two anchored cantilevers, each 310 feet long, carrying a suspended span of 200 ft in the middle. This design was considered feasible and became known as the Lansdowne Bridge. The girder work of this bridge was given to Westwood, Baillie & Co. of London. The bridge was first put together in the contractor's yard. The 170 feet tall cantilevers of the bridge when assembled, made quite a conspicuous scene in London. By 1887 the steel work started to arrive at Sukkur and Rohri. The bridge construction was then started under the supervision of F.E. Robertson and Hecquet, whereas, local contractors were Malik Abdul Karim & Malik Abdul Raheem. Their names are written to date on a plaque on each cantilever of the bridge.

The construction of Lansdowne Bridge was no joke. It is said that the bridge designer did not think much about how the bridge would be built in real life. Giant derricks, each weighing 240 tons and each being 230 feet in length had to be erected leaning out over the water and at the same time they had to incline inwards in the plane at right-angles to the line of the bridge. And as if that was not difficult enough, horizontal tie girders 123 feet long and weighing 86 tons each had to be assembled at a height of 180 feet. This indeed was a challenge in the 1880s.

When both cantilevers were completed, work started on the center span. The bridge designer had intended that the 200-ft. long span would be assembled on boats and then hoisted up. This plan did not work in practice as the Indus remained quite violent 6 months of the year owing to floods. In the end, Robertson built another temporary bridge to provide a platform on which the suspended span could be put together. The temporary staging weighed 56 tons. The permanent girder work of the 200-ft. span was erected and riveted in four-and-a-half days. This is good going even by today's standards. In the 1880s, Robertson's men did not have pneumatic tools or electric drives.

The Human and Monetary Cost

The construction of Lansdowne bridge claimed 6 lives. Four men fell from the dizzy heights and 2 were killed by tools falling on them. The cost of the bridge was Rs 2,696,000 including Rs 276,000 that were spent on foundations only.

See also

 Sukkur
 Ayub Bridge
 Sukkur barrage

External links

References

Bridges in Sindh
Railway bridges in Pakistan
Bridges completed in 1889
Bridges over the Indus River
Former railway bridges
1889 establishments in British India
Tourist attractions in Sukkur